A kiva is a space used by Puebloans for rites and political meetings, many of them associated with the kachina belief system. Among the modern Hopi and most other Pueblo peoples, "kiva" means a large room that is circular and underground, and  used for spiritual ceremonies.

Similar subterranean rooms are found among ruins in the North-American South-West, indicating uses by the ancient peoples of the region including the ancestral Puebloans, the Mogollon, and the Hohokam. Those used by the ancient Pueblos of the Pueblo I Period and following, designated by the Pecos Classification system developed by archaeologists, were usually round and evolved from simpler pit-houses. For the Ancestral Puebloans, these rooms are believed to have had a variety of functions, including domestic residence along with social and ceremonial purposes.

Evolution

During the late 8th century, Mesa Verdeans started building square pit structures that archeologists call protokivas. Mesa Verde-style kivas included a feature from earlier times called a sipapu, which is a hole dug in the north of the chamber that is thought to represent the Ancestral Puebloans' place of emergence from the underworld.

When designating an ancient room as a kiva, archaeologists make assumptions about the room's original functions and how those functions may be similar to or differ from kivas used in modern practice.  The kachina belief system appears to have emerged in the South-West around A.D. 1250, while kiva-like structures occurred much earlier.  This suggests that the room's older functions may have been changed or adapted to suit the new religious practice.

As cultural changes occurred, particularly during the Pueblo III period between 1150 and 1300, kivas continued to have a prominent place in the community.  However, some kivas were built above ground. Kiva architecture became more elaborate, with tower kivas and great kivas incorporating specialized floor features. For example, kivas found in Mesa Verde National Park were generally keyhole-shaped. In most larger communities, it was normal to find one kiva for each five or six rooms. Kiva destruction, primarily by burning, has been seen as a strong archaeological indicator of conflict and warfare among people of the South-West during this period.

Fifteen top rooms encircle the central chamber of the vast Great Kiva at Aztec Ruins National Monument.  The rooms'

After 1325 or 1350, except in the Hopi and Pueblo region, the ratio changed from 60 to 90 rooms for each kiva. This may indicate a religious or organizational change within the society, perhaps affecting the status and number of clans among the Pueblo people.

Great kiva
Great kivas differ from regular kivas, which archeologists call Chaco-style kivas (although Chaco Canyon also features great kivas), in several ways; first and foremost, great kivas are always much larger and deeper than Chaco-style kivas. Whereas the walls of great kivas always extend above the surrounding landscape, the walls of Chaco-style kivas do not, but are instead flush with the surrounding landscape. Chaco-style kivas are often found incorporated into the central room blocks of great houses, but great kivas are always separate from core structures. Great kivas almost always have a bench that encircles the inner space, but this feature is not found in Chaco-style kivas. Great kivas also tend to include floor vaults, which might have served as foot drums for ceremonial dancers, but Chaco-style kivas do not. Great kivas are believed to be the first public buildings constructed in the Mesa Verde region.

See also
 False Kiva
 Fogou
 Koshare Indian Museum and Dancers
 Pueblo clown
 Souterrain
 Temenos
 Zemlyanka

References
Citations

Bibliography

Further reading

External links

  La Kiva tradicional de Oscar Freire
 
 

Religious places of the indigenous peoples of North America
Puebloan architectural elements
Pueblo culture
Semi-subterranean structures